Arabiens Drøm is the first studio album by the Danish singer Anne Gadegaard who was the representative of Denmark in the Junior Eurovision Song Contest 2003. The album takes its title from the song which was performed at the contest.  It was also released in the same year. The album was quite successful in Denmark, although it was not released in the US or the UK. Two of the songs were released as singles, "Arabiens Drøm" followed by "Jamaica".

Track listing
(titles in brackets are for translation purposes only)
Arabiens Drøm            (Arabian Dream)
Festen                   (The Party)
Luis                     (Luis)
Min Bedste Ven           (My Best Friend)
Jamaica                  (Jamaica)
Choco Og Nugga           (Chocolate and Nougat)
Dine Øjne Blå            (Your Blue Eyes)
Prinsesserne På Is       (Princess On Ice)
Mor Dig Godt             (Have Fun)
Tju Tju Bang             (Hey Hey Bang)
Danser Natten Lang       (Dancing All Night Long)

Chart performance

Weekly charts

Release history

References

2003 debut albums
Anne Gadegaard albums
Danish-language albums